Tally commonly refers to counting or to summation of a total amount, debt, or score (Oxford English Reference Dictionary).
Tally may also refer to:

Counting
 Tally (voting), an unofficial private observation of an election count carried out under Proportional Representation using the Single Transferable Vote
 Tally counter, a mechanical device used to maintain a linear count
 Tally for knitting, or row counter for hand knitting, a tally counter for counting rows or courses worked, for counting stitch pattern repetitions, or for counting increases or decreases of the number of stitches in consecutive rows
 Tally marks, a form of numeral used in a unary numeral system, most useful in counting or tallying ongoing results, such as the score in a game or sport
 Tally sort, a computer science counting and sorting algorithm
 Tally stick, an ancient memory aid device to record and document numbers, quantities, or even messages
 Fu (tally), a Chinese tally stick used as proof of authorization

Places 
 Tallahassee, Florida, nicknamed Tally
 Tally Ho, Victoria, a locality within the suburb of Burwood East, Victoria, Australia
 Tally Too'er, in Leith, Edinburgh, Scotland, is one of the country's three martello towers
 Tally-Ho Plantation House, a home in Louisiana
 Tallygaroopna, Victoria, a town in the Goulburn Valley region of Victoria, Australia
 Tallygaroopna railway station, Victoria, a railway station in Victoria, Australia
 Tallysville, Virginia, an unincorporated community in New Kent County, Virginia, United States

People

Given name 
 Tally Brown (1934–1989), a singer and actress
 Tally Hall (soccer) (born 1985), Talmon Henry "Tally" Hall, an American soccer player
 Tally Holmes, an African American tennis player in the 1910s and 1920s
 Tally Sneddon (1914–1995), Scottish professional football wing half and manager
 Tally Stevens (1923–1995), Floyd C. "Tally" Stevens, the head coach for Brigham Young University Cougars football team from 1959–1960
 Tallys, Tallys Machado de Oliveira (born 1987), Brazilian attacking midfielder

Surname 
 Harry Tally (1866–1939), American singer
 Lura S. Tally (1921–2012), a retired legislator from North Carolina
 Robert Tally (born 1969), an American literary critic
 Ted Tally (born 1952), an American playwright and screenwriter
 Thomas Lincoln Tally (1861–1945), operated the Electric Theater in Los Angeles
 William Tally, an American engineer and former CTO of Saleen, Inc

Arts, entertainment, and media
 Tally (painting), a 1994 painting by Ellen Gallagher

Fictitious characters
 Tally Man, two fictional characters in the DC Universe
 Tally Wong, a Celebrity DeathMatch character
 Tally Youngblood, a fictional character in the Uglies series, written by Scott Westerfeld

Music
 Tally Hall (band), an American rock band formed in December 2002 based in Ann Arbor, Michigan
 Tally Ho! (album), an album by Luke Vibert under the alias Wagon Christ

Brands and enterprises 
 Tally (company), a defunct printer company
 Tally Solutions, an Indian multinational financial accounting software company
 TallyPrime, enterprise resource planning software developed by Tally Solutions
 Tally Technologies, a debt management app in the U.S. and makers of the Tally app
 Tally Weijl, a chain clothing retailer in Europe
 Tally-Ho (rolling papers), an Australian brand of cigarette rolling paper
 TallyGenicom, a defunct printer company

Sports
 ASC Niarry Tally, a football club from Senegal
 Tally-ho, a phrase used in hunting
 Tallygaroopna Football Club, an Australian rules football club

Other uses
 Tally (cap), a ribbon on a sailor's cap
 Tally language, a form of unary language in computational complexity theory
 Tally light, a small signal-lamp on a television camera or monitor
 Tally's War, an incident in 1863 in Iowa, in which pro-war individuals opened fire on a peace demonstration

See also 
 Talley (disambiguation)